The Connecticut Amateur is the state amateur golf championship in Connecticut. First played in 1899, it is one of the oldest state amateur championships in the United States.

History 
In modern times, the tournament usually begins with two qualifying rounds of stroke play. The medalist earns the R.M. Grant Medalist honors. The top 32 players then move on to the match play format of the tournament. The match play consists of two rounds each of the next two days. On the third and final day of match play, the remaining two players compete in a 36-hole final.

Reverend William T. Lee, pastor of the Emanuel Lutheran Church in New Haven, won the Connecticut Amateur three times from 1975 to 1990.

Winners 

Source:

R.M. Grant Medalist 
The R.M. Grant Medalist goes to the medalist of the qualifying rounds. It is named after the amateur golfer Robert M. Grant. Grant won the Connecticut Amateur three times in the mid-20th century.

Source:

References 

Golf in Connecticut
Amateur golf tournaments in the United States
Recurring sporting events established in 1899
1899 establishments in Connecticut